Lah-e Deraz or Lah Deraz or Leh-e Deraz or Leh Deraz may refer to:
 Lah-e Deraz, Borujen, Chaharmahal and Bakhtiari Province
 Leh Deraz, Lordegan, Chaharmahal and Bakhtiari Province